The Nastro d'Argento, also known by its translated name Silver Ribbon, is an Italian film award awarded each year since 1946 by the Italian National Syndicate of Film Journalists (Italian: Sindacato Nazionale Giornalisti Cinematografici Italiani). It is the oldest Italian film award, given every year at the Teatro Antico in Taormina (Sicily).

Awards
The awards are currently given in the following categories:
Best Film (Miglior film; since 2017)
Best Director (Miglior regista, since 2017)
Best Comedy (Migliore commedia; since 2009)
Best New Director (Miglior regista esordiente; since 1974)
Best Producer (Miglior produttore; since 1954)
Best Original Story (Migliore soggetto)
Best Screenplay (Migliore sceneggiatura; since 1948)
 Best Actor (Migliore attore protagonista)
 Best Actress (Migliore attrice protagonista)
 Best Supporting Actor (Migliore attore non protagonista)
 Best Supporting Actress (Migliore attrice non protagonista)
Best Comedy Actor (Migliore attore di commedia; since 2018)
Best Comedy Actress (Migliore attrice di commedia; since 2018)
Best Cinematography (Migliore fotografia)
Best Production Design (Migliore scenografia)
Best Costume Design (Migliori costumi; since 1953)
 Best Score (Migliore colonna sonora; since 1947)
Best Original Song (Migliore canzone originale; since 1999)
Best Editing (Migliore montaggio; since 1990)
Best Sound (Migliore sonoro in presa diretta; since 2002)
Best Casting Director (Miglior casting director; since 2014)
Best Documentary (Miglior documentario)
Best Documentary on Cinema (Miglior documentario sul cinema)
Best Short Film (Miglior cortometraggio)
Life Achievement Award (Nastro d'argento alla carriera)
Special Award (Nastro d'argento speciale)
Best Dubbing (Miglior doppiaggio)

Defunct awards:
 Director of Best Film (Regista del miglior film; 1946–2016)
 Director of Best Foreign Film (Regista del miglior film straniero; 1956–2006)
Best European Film (Miglior film europeo; 2007–2012)
Best Non-European Foreign Film (Miglior film extraeuropeo; 2007–2012)
Best 3D Film (Miglior film in 3D; 2010)
European Silver Ribbon Award (Nastro d'argento europeo; 1989–2020)

See also 
 Cinema of Italy
 Italian entertainment awards
 Taormina Film Fest

References

External links 
 Italian National Syndicate of Film Journalists official site